The DRDO light tank(डीआरडीओ लाइट टैंक बनाएँ) is a tracked amphibious light tank developed in India by DRDO. It is based on the "Sarath" chassis, a licensed variant of the Soviet BMP infantry fighting vehicle. It was built by the Ordnance Factory Medak with a French GIAT TS-90 turret and 105 mm gun.  This was an experimental vehicle, designed to carry high-caliber weapons without sacrificing mobility.

Development
The "Design and Development of Light Tank on BMP-I" project approved in 1983 was intended to be completed in 1986. It never reached completion but continued in production and trials until 1996 at a total cost of Rs 4.53 crore (Rs 2.91 through foreign exchange), well beyond its estimated Rs 2.54 crore. The army, which had inspired the project with a 1976 GSQR, determined in July 1985 that a light tank on BMP was not needed, but did not withdraw its association from the project and even made suggestions that led in 1988 to 105mm turrets being implemented rather than the planned 90mm turrets. In May 1993, a year after the project left the Combat Vehicles Research and Development Establishment, Avadi, to come under the governance of Vehicle Research and Development Establishment, Ahmednagar, the Army again announced that the light tank was unnecessary. Nevertheless, firing trials continued until August 1996, notwithstanding the February 1994 recommendation of the scientific advisor to Raksha Mantri that the project be closed.

Features
Crew: 3 men for turret
Main Gun: 105 mm semi-automatic with muzzle brake
Turret: Al alloy with 12.7 AP protection level
Ammunition: APFSDS, APDS, HESH
Fire Control System (FCS): COTAC semi-automatic
Stowing capability: Main gun–42 rounds (turret–10 rounds; ammunition compartment–32 rounds)
Accurate ranging by Laser Range Finder (LRF)
Low-light level TV for commander and gunner
Panoramic sight for Commander
Amphibious capabilities

References

Light tanks of India
Defence Research and Development Organisation
Light tanks of the Cold War